The Men's team épée event of the 2014 World Fencing Championships was held from 22–23 July 2014.

Medalists

Draw

Finals

Top half

Bottom half

Placement rounds

5–8th place

9–16th place

13–16th place

Final classification

References
 Bracket
 Final classification

2014 World Fencing Championships